This article is a list of teams that play in one of the six major sports leagues in the United States and Canada: the Canadian Football League (CFL), Major League Baseball (MLB), Major League Soccer (MLS), the National Basketball Association (NBA), the National Football League (NFL) and the National Hockey League (NHL). 

Est. represents the first year the team played in its current media market. For brevity, only the most recent names for teams that have had multiple nicknames in their current media market are listed. Future expansion teams whose inaugural seasons are confirmed are also included in this list.

Teams

See also
Major professional sports leagues in the United States and Canada
List of professional sports leagues
List of defunct sports leagues
List of American and Canadian cities by number of major professional sports franchises
List of professional sports teams in the United States and Canada
List of top level minor league sports teams in the United States by city
List of soccer clubs in the United States by city

References

Lists of sports teams in Canada
Sports teams in the United States
Professional sports leagues in the United States
Professional sports leagues in Canada